The 1966–67 Washington Huskies men's basketball team represented the University of Washington for the 1966–67 NCAA University Division basketball season. Led by fourth-year head coach Mac Duckworth, the Huskies were members of the Athletic Association of Western Universities (Pacific-8) and played their home games on campus at Hec Edmundson Pavilion in Seattle, Washington.

References

External links
Sports Reference – Washington Huskies: 1966–67 basketball season

Washington Huskies men's basketball seasons
Washington Huskies
Washington
Washington